In geometry, Fagnano's problem is an optimization problem that was first stated by Giovanni Fagnano in 1775:

The solution is the orthic triangle, with vertices at the base points of the altitudes of the given triangle.

Solution
The orthic triangle, with vertices at the base points of the altitudes of the given triangle, has the smallest perimeter of all  triangles inscribed into an acute triangle, hence it is the solution of Fagnano's problem. Fagnano's original proof used calculus methods and an intermediate result given by his father Giulio Carlo de' Toschi di Fagnano. Later however several geometric proofs were discovered as well, amongst others by Hermann Schwarz and Lipót Fejér. These proofs use the geometrical properties of reflections to determine some minimal path representing the perimeter.

Physical principles
A solution from physics is found by imagining putting a rubber band that follows Hooke's Law around the three sides of a triangular frame , such that it could slide around smoothly. Then the rubber band would end up in a position that minimizes its elastic energy, and therefore minimize its total length. This position gives the minimal perimeter triangle.
The tension inside the rubber band is the same everywhere in the rubber band, so in its resting position, we have, by Lami's theorem, 

Therefore, this minimal triangle is the orthic triangle.

See also
Set TSP problem, a more general task of visiting each of a family of sets by the shortest tour

References
Heinrich Dörrie: 100 Great Problems of Elementary Mathematics: Their History and Solution. Dover Publications 1965, p. 359-360. , problem 90 (restricted online version (Google Books))
Paul J. Nahin: When Least is Best: How Mathematicians Discovered Many Clever Ways to Make Things as Small (or as Large) as Possible.  Princeton University Press 2004, p. 67
Coxeter, H. S. M.; Greitzer, S. L.:Geometry Revisited. Washington, DC: Math. Assoc. Amer. 1967, pp. 88–89.
H.A. Schwarz: Gesammelte Mathematische Abhandlungen, vol. 2. Berlin 1890, pp. 344-345. (online at the Internet Archive, German)

External links
Fagnano's problem at cut-the-knot
Fagnano's problem in the Encyclopaedia of Mathematics
Fagnano's problem at a website for triangle geometry

Triangle problems